Xenophanes of Colophon (c. 570 – c. 478 BC) was a Greek philosopher, theologian, poet, and critic of Homer from Ionia who travelled throughout the Greek-speaking world in early Classical Antiquity. 

As a poet, Xenophanes was known for his critical style, writing poems that are considered among the first satires. He also composed elegiac couplets that criticised his society's traditional values of wealth, excesses, and athletic victories. He also criticised Homer and the other poets in his works for representing the gods as foolish or morally weak. His poems have not survived intact; only fragments of some of his work survives in quotations by later philosophers and literary critics.

Xenophanes is seen as one of the most important pre-Socratic philosophers. A highly original thinker, Xenophanes sought explanations for physical phenomena such as clouds or rainbows without references to divine or mythological explanations, but instead based on first principles. He also distinguished between different forms of knowledge and belief as an early proponent of epistemology. Later philosophers such as the Eleatics and the Pyrrhonists also saw Xenophanes as the founder of their doctrines, and interpreted his work in terms of those doctrines, although modern scholarship disputes these claims.

Life
The Ancient biographer Diogenes Laertius reports that Xenophanes was born in Colophon, a city that once existed in Ionia, in present day Turkey. Laertius says that Xenophanes is said to have flourished during the 60th Olympiad (540–537 BC), and modern scholars generally place his birth some time around 570-560 BC. By his own surviving account, he was an itinerant poet who left his native land at the age of 25 and then lived 67 years in other Greek lands, dying at or after the age of 92. Although ancient testimony notes that he buried his sons, there is little other biographical information about him or his family that can be reliably ascertained.

Many later ancient accounts associate Xenophanes with the Greek colony in the Italian city of Elea, either as the author of a poem on the founding of that city, or as the founder of the Eleatic school of philosophy, or as the teacher of Parmenides of Elea. Others associate him with Pythagoreanism. However, modern scholars generally believe that there is little historical or philosophical justification for these associations.

Influence 
His surviving work refers to Thales, Epimenides, and Pythagoras, and he himself is mentioned in the writings of Heraclitus and Epicharmus.

Poems

Knowledge of Xenophanes' views comes from fragments of his poetry that surivive as quotations by later Greek writers. Unlike other pre-socratic philosophers such as Heraclitus or Parmenides, who only wrote one work, Xenophanes wrote a variety of poems, and no two of the fragments can positively be identified as belonging to the same text. According to Diogenes Laertius, Xenophanes wrote a poem on the foundation of Colophon and Elea, which ran to approximately 2000 lines. Later testimony also suggests that his collection of satires was assembled in at least five books.  Although many later sources attribute a poem titled "On Nature" to Xenophanes, modern scholars doubt this label, as it was likely a name given by scholars at the Library of Alexandria to works written by philosophers that Aristotle had identified as "phusikoi" who studied nature.

Satires 
The satires are called Silloi by late writers, and this name may go back to Xenophanes himself, but it may originate in the fact that the Pyrrhonist philosopher Timon of Phlius, the "sillographer" (3rd century BC), put much of his own satire upon other philosophers into the mouth of Xenophanes, one of the few philosophers Timon praises in his work.

Xenophanes' surviving writings display a skepticism that became more commonly expressed during the fourth century BC. Several of the philosophical fragments are derived from commentators on Homer. He aimed his critique at the polytheistic religious views of earlier Greek poets and of his own contemporaries

To judge from these later accounts, his elegiac and iambic poetry criticized and satirized a wide range of ideas, including Homer and Hesiod, the belief in the pantheon of anthropomorphic gods and the Greeks' veneration of athleticism.

On Nature 
There is no good authority that says that Xenophanes specifically wrote a philosophical poem. John Burnet says that "The oldest reference to a poem Περὶ φύσεως is in the Geneva scholium on Iliad xxi. 196, and this goes back to Crates of Mallus. We must remember that such titles are of later date, and Xenophanes had been given a place among philosophers long before the time of rates. All we can say, therefore, is that the Pergamene librarians gave the title Περὶ φύσεως to some poem of Xenophanes." However, even if Xenophanes never wrote a specific poem title On Nature, many of the suriviving fragments deal with topics in natural philosophy such as clouds or rainbows, and it is thus likely that the philosophical remarks of Xenophanes were expressed incidentally in his satires.

Philosophy
Although Xenophanes has traditionally been interpreted in terms of the Eleatics and Skeptics who were influenced by him and saw him as their predecessor and founder, modern scholarship has revealed him to be a highly original and distinct philosopher whose philosophy extends well beyond the influence he had on later philosophical schools. As a social critic, Xenophanes composed poems on proper behavior at a symposium and criticized the cultural glorification of athletes. Xenophanes sought to reform the understanding of divine nature by casting doubt on Greek mythology as relayed by Hesiod and Homer, in order to make it more consistent with notions of piety from Ancient Greek religion. He composed natural explanations for phenomena such as the formation of clouds and rainbows rather than myths, satirizing traditional religious views of his time as human projections. As an early thinker in epistemology, he drew distinctions between the ideas of knowledge and belief as opposed to truth, which he believed was only possible for the gods.

Social criticism 
Xenophanes wrote a number of elegiac poems on proper conduct at a symposium, the Ancient Greek drinking parties that were held in commemorate athletic or poetic victories, or to welcome young men into aristocratic society. The surviving fragments stress the importance of piety and honor to the gods, and they discourage drunkenness and intemperance, endorsing moderation and criticism of luxury and excess. Xenophanes also rejected the value of athletic victories, stating that cultivating wisdom was more important..

Divine Nature 
Orphism and Pythagorean philosophy introduced into the Greek spirituality the notions of guilt and pureness, causing a dichotomic belief between the divine soul and the mortal body. This doctrine is in contrast with the traditional religions as espoused by Homer and Hesiod. God moves all things, but he is thought to be immobile, characterized by oneness and unicity, eternity, and a spiritual nature which is bodiless and isn't anthropomorphic. He has a free will and is the Highest Good, he embodies the beauty of the moral perfection and of the absence of sin.

Xenophanes espoused a belief that "God is one, supreme among gods and men, and not like mortals in body or in mind." He maintained there was one greatest God. God is one eternal being, spherical in form, comprehending all things within himself, is the absolute mind and thought,  therefore is intelligent, and moves all things, but bears no resemblance to human nature either in body or mind. While Xenophanes is rejecting Homeric theology, he is not questioning the presence of a divine entity, rather his philosophy is a critique on Ancient Greek writers and their conception of divinity. Regarding Xenophanes' positive theology five key concepts about God can be formed. God is: beyond human morality, does not resemble human form, cannot die or be born (God is divine thus eternal), no divine hierarchy exists, and God does not intervene in human affairs.

Natural Philosophy 

Xenophanes' understanding of divine nature as separate and uninvolved in human affairs motivated him to come up with naturalistic explanations for physical phenomena. 

Xenophanes was likely the first philosopher to come up with an explanation for the manifestation of St. Elmo's fire that appears on the masts of ships when they pass through clouds during a thunderstorm. Although the actual phenomenon behind St. Elmo's fire would not be understood until the discovery of static electricity in the modern era, Xenophanes' explanation, which attempted to explain the glow as being caused by agitations of small droplets of clouds was unique in the ancient world.

In Xenophanes' cosmology, there is only one boundary to the universe, the one "seen by our feet". Xenophanes believed that the earth extended infinitely far down, as well as infinitely far in every direction. A consequence of his belief in an infinitely extended earth was that rather than having the sun pass under the earth at sunset, Xenophanes believed that the sun and the moon traveled along a straight line westward, after which point a new sun or moon would be reconstituted after an eclipse. While this potentially infinite series of suns and moons traveling would likely be considered objectionable to modern scientists, this means that Xenophanes understood the sun and moon as a "type" of object that appeared in the sky, rather than a specific individual object that reappeared every new day.

Xenophanes concluded from his examination of fossils of sea creatures that were found above land that water once must have covered all of the Earth's surface. He used this evidence to conclude that the cosmic principle of the universe was a tide flowing in and out between wet and dry, or earth (γῆ) and water (ὕδωρ). These two extreme states would alternate between one another, and with the alternation human life would become extinct, then regenerate (or vice versa depending on the dominant form). The idea of alternating states and human life perishing and coming back suggests he believed in the principle of causation, another distinguishing step that Xenophanes takes away from Ancient philosophical traditions to ones based more on scientific observation. The argument can be considered a rebuke to Anaximenes' air theory. This use of evidence was an important step in advancing from simply stating an idea to backing it up by evidence and observation.

Epistemology 
Xenophanes held that there actually exists a truth of reality, but that humans as mortals are unable to know it. Hence his views are considered a precursor to Pyrrhonism and subsequent Western philosophical skepticism. He is also credited with being one of the first philosophers to distinguish between true belief and knowledge, which he further developed into the prospect that you can know something but not really know it. His verses on skepticism are quoted by Sextus Empiricus as follows:
Yet, with respect to the gods and what I declare about all things.
No man has seen what is clear nor ever will any man know it.
Nay, for e’en should he chance to affirm what is really existent,
He himself knoweth it not ; for all is swayed by opining.
Due to the lack of whole works by Xenophanes, his views are difficult to interpret, so that the implication of knowing being something deeper ("a clearer truth") may have special implications, or it may mean that you cannot know something just by looking at it. It is known that the most and widest variety of evidence was considered by Xenophanes to be the surest way to prove a theory.

Legacy 
The thought of Xenophanes was summarized as monolatrous and pantheistic by the ancient doxographies of Aristotle, Cicero, Diogenes Laertius, Sextus Empiricus, and Plutarch. More particularly, the Metaphysics of Aristotle referred that for him "the All is God" . Differently from the human creatures, God has the power to give "immediate execution" (in Greek: to phren) and make effective his cognitive faculty (in Greek: nous). The pseudo-Aristotlelian treatise On Melissus, Xenophanes, and Gorgias also contains a significant testimony of his teachings . Though Xenophanes has been interpreted as a pantheist, his statements seem to contradict the view, stating “god shakes all things”.

Eusebius quoting Aristocles of Messene says that Xenophanes was the founder of a line of philosophy that culminated in Pyrrhonism. This line begins with Xenophanes and goes through Parmenides, Melissus of Samos, Zeno of Elea, Leucippus, Democritus, Protagoras, Nessos of Chios, Metrodorus of Chios, Diogenes of Smyrna, Anaxarchus, and finally Pyrrho. It had also been common since antiquity to see Xenophanes as the teacher of Zeno of Elea, the colleague of Parmenides, and generally associated with the Eleatic school, but common opinion today is likewise that this is false.

Xenophanes is considered by some to be a precursor to Parmenides and Spinoza in pantheism. Because of his development of the concept of a "one god greatest among gods and men" that is abstract, universal, unchanging, immobile and always present, Xenophanes is often seen as one of the first monotheists, in the Western philosophy of religion, although the quotation that seems to point to Xenophanes' monotheism also refers to multiple "gods" who the supreme God is greater than. Physicist and philosopher Max Bernhard Weinstein specifically identified Xenophanes as one of the earliest pandeists. Karl Popper read Xenophanes as an early precursor of critical rationalism, saying that it is possible to act only on the basis of working hypotheses—we may act as if we knew the truth, as long as we know that this is extremely unlikely.

Notes

References

Bibliography

Ancient Primary Sources 

In the Diels-Kranz numbering for testimony and fragments of Pre-Socratic philosophy, Xenophanes is catalogued as number 21.

Biography 

A1. 
A2. 
A3. 
A4. 
A5. 
A6. 
A7. 
A8. 
A9. 
A10.

Apothegems 

A11. 
A12. 
A13. 
A14. 
A15. 
A16. 
A17.

Descriptions of Poems 

A18. 
A19. 
A20. 
A21. 
A22. 
A23. 
A24. 
A25. 
A26. 
A27.

Doctrines 

A28. 
A29. 
A30. 
A31. 
A32. 
A33. 
A34. 
A35. 
A36-46. 
A47. 
A48. 
A49. 
A50. 
A51. 
A52.

Fragments - Elegies 

B1. 
B2. 
B3. 
B4. 
B5. 
B6. 
B7. 
B8. 
B9.

Fragments - Silloi 

B10. 
B11. 
B12. 
B13. 
 B14-15. 
 B16. 
B17. 
B18. 
B19. 
B20. 
B21. 
B21a. 
B22.

Fragments - On Nature 

B23. 
B24. 
B25. 
B26. 
B27. 
B28. 
B29. 
B30. 
B31. 
B32. 
B33. 
B34. 
B35. 
B36. 
B37. 
B38. 
B39. 
B40. 
B41. 
B42. 
B45.

Imitation 

C1. 
C2

Modern Criticism

Modern Scholarship

Translations of the Fragments with Commentary

Extended Studies and Reviews

Further reading 

 
 Classen, C. J. 1989. "Xenophanes and the Tradition of Epic Poetry". In Ionian Philosophy. Edited by K. Boudouris, 91–103. Athens, Greece: International Association for Greek Philosophy.

External links

 Xenophanes of Colophon by Giannis Stamatellos
 Xenophanes of Colophon - Primary and secondary resources (link broken, June 9, 2019, archived page)
 J. Lesher, Presocratic Contributions to the Theory of Knowledge, 1998
 U. De Young, "The Homeric Gods and Xenophanes' Opposing Theory of the Divine", 2000

470s BC deaths
570s BC births
6th-century BC Greek people
6th-century BC philosophers
6th-century BC poets
5th-century BC Greek people
5th-century BC philosophers
5th-century BC poets
Ancient Colophonians
Ancient Greek elegiac poets
Ancient Greek epistemologists
Ancient Greek metaphysicians
Ancient Greek satirists
Ancient Skeptic philosophers
Iambic poets
Philosophers of ancient Ionia
Philosophers of religion
Presocratic philosophers